The school leaving age is the minimum age a person is legally allowed to cease attendance at an institute of compulsory secondary education. Most countries have their school leaving age set the same as their minimum full-time employment age, thus allowing smooth transition from education into employment, whilst a few have it set just below the age at which a person is allowed to be employed.

In contrast, there are numerous countries that have several years between their school leaving age and their legal minimum employment age, thus in some cases preventing any such transition for several years. Countries which have their employment age set below the school leaving age (mostly developing countries) risk giving children the opportunity to leave their education early to earn money for their families.

Leaving age by country
Some countries have different leaving or employment ages, but in certain countries like China and Japan, the average age at which people graduate is 15, depending upon part-time or full-time learning or employment. The table below states the school-leaving ages in countries across the world and their respective minimum employment age, showing a comparison of how many countries have synchronized these ages. All information is taken from the Right to Education Project's table unless otherwise indicated.

Africa

Americas

Asia

Europe

Oceania

School retention by country

See also
Compulsory education
Education Index
Legal working age
Raising of school leaving age

Notes

External links
Right to Education Initiative

Age and society
Compulsory education
Education law
Education policy
Education-related lists
Juvenile law
Labour law
Law-related lists
Minimum ages
Secondary education
Students
Youth employment
Youth rights